Juanjuí District is one of five districts of the province Mariscal Cáceres in Peru.

References